Roßla (also: Rossla) is a village and a former municipality in the Mansfeld-Südharz district, Saxony-Anhalt, Germany. Since 1 January 2010, it is part of the municipality Südharz. From 1706–1803, Rossla was the seat of Stolberg-Rossla.

External links

Former municipalities in Saxony-Anhalt
Südharz
Villages in the Harz